The Southern Miss Golden Eagles basketball program represents intercollegiate men's basketball at the University of Southern Mississippi. The school competes in the Sun Belt Conference in Division I of the NCAA and plays their home games at Reed Green Coliseum, which has a capacity of 8,095.

History
From its first season (1912–13), when Coach R. G. Slay led the team to a 3–0 record, the men's basketball team has enjoyed its share of success. Coach A. B. Dille took over coaching duties the following year. The Golden Eagles have appeared in the NAIA National Tournament four times in a row (1952, 1953, 1954 and 1955). Southern Miss had a 2–4 record in the NAIA Tournament.

Over the years, the Golden Eagles have had three NCAA teams (1990, 1991, 2012). The program has also had an NIT Championship team with its run in the 1987 postseason tournament. In all the Eagles have earned ten NIT bids: 1981, 1986, 1987, 1988, 1994, 1995, 1998, 2001, 2013 and 2014.

They also earned a CIT bid in 2010 and a CBI bid in 2019.

The team has had six players drafted including Clarence Weatherspoon. Southern Miss has won three conference championships in basketball including the 2023 outright regular-season title.

Postseason

NCAA tournament results
Southern Miss Golden Eagles have appeared in three NCAA tournaments. They have an overall 0–3 record in tournament games. Darrin Chancellor holds the Southern Miss single-tournament scoring record with 24 points in 1991.

NIT results
The Golden Eagles have appeared in the National Invitation Tournament (NIT) 11 times. Their combined record is 11–10 and they were NIT Champions in 1987.

CIT
The Golden Eagles have appeared in the CollegeInsider.com Postseason Tournament (CIT) one time. Their record is 0–1.

CBI
The Golden Eagles have appeared in the College Basketball Invitational (CBI) one time. Their record is 0–1

NAIA tournament results
The Golden Eagles have appeared in the NAIA Tournament four times. Their combined record is 2–4.

Notable alumni
 Joe Dawson '82 – former professional basketball player, 1992 Israeli Basketball Premier League MVP
 Randolph Keys '88 – former NBA basketball player, 1st Round draft pick (retired)
 Wendell Ladner '70 – former ABA player (deceased)
 Don Maestri '68 – men's basketball head coach Troy University
 Kelly McCarty '98 – former professional basketball player
 Elvin Mims '02 – PBL, USBL, NBL player, 6x champion
 Clarence Weatherspoon '92 – former NBA basketball player

References

 Remember the ABA – Wendell Ladner

External links